The Code is an Australian drama television program created and produced by Shelley Birse. Developed from a partnership between Playmaker Media and the Australian Broadcasting Corporation, it premiered on ABC1 in Australia on 21 September 2014, and the first season aired through 26 October 2014. Season 2 of The Code premiered on 1 September 2016, and aired through 6 October 2016.

The first six-part series, set in both outback and metropolitan areas of Australia, interweaves several plot lines. The first follows brothers Ned (Dan Spielman) and Jesse Banks (Ashley Zukerman), who publish a video of a mysterious outback accident, and Hani Parande (Adele Perovic), who becomes involved with them. The second follows the accident, which sees teacher Alex Wisham (Lucy Lawless) and policeman Tim Simons (Aaron Pedersen) becoming involved in the personal affairs of accused teenager Clarence Boyd (Aaron L. McGrath). The third covers Ned's journalism office, managed by Perry Benson (Adam Garcia). The fourth chronicles the intrigues of Deputy Prime Minister Ian Bradley (David Wenham), and political staffers Randall Keats (Aden Young) and Sophie Walsh (Chelsie Preston Crayford) while the after-effects of the accident unfold.

ABC in June 2015 renewed The Code for a second season, after receiving significant funding from the Australian Capital Territory's film fund, Screen ACT.  The new series that commenced screening in 2016, deals with fictional brothers Ned and Jesse Banks facing deportation to the United States of America to face trial in connection with security breaches.  Anthony LaPaglia, Sigrid Thornton, Robyn Malcolm, and others joined the cast for the second series.

Synopsis
Series 1: A stolen vehicle collides with a transport truck in the middle of the desert. Two Aboriginal teenagers in the car are critically injured but nobody called for help because someone involved works for a major stakeholder in a secret research project. The accident would have remained a mystery if it weren't for Ned Banks, a young internet journalist desperate for a break and his brother Jesse Banks, a hacker on a strict good behaviour bond.

Series 2: Two Australians are murdered in West Papua, the only survivor being Jan Roth, the fugitive founder of a "dark web" site, who is being chased by both Australian and US authorities. At the same time a young boy is kidnapped in Australia by someone offering to sell him to paedophiles through the same site. The Australian Federal Police contacts the Banks brothers and informs them that the US authorities have demanded their extradition to the US for their previous actions, but if Jesse helps the police find the boy, the government will resist the extradition demands. Jesse agrees, but soon finds that the truth is very different.

Cast

Main 
 Dan Spielman as Ned Banks, journalist at Password
 Ashley Zukerman as Jesse Banks, Ned's brother
 Adele Perovic as Hani Parande, student and hacktivist who befriends Jesse

Series 1 
 Adam Garcia as Perry Benson, chief editor of internet news journal, Password
 Chelsie Preston Crayford as Sophie Walsh, director of communications at PM's office
 Paul Tassone as Andy King, head of security at Physanto
 Dan Wyllie as Lyndon Joyce, AFP investigator
 Lucy Lawless as Alex Wisham, schoolteacher at Lindara
 Aden Young as Randall Keats, Chief of Staff, Department of Prime Minister and Cabinet
 David Wenham as Ian Bradley, Deputy Prime Minister and Minister for Foreign Affairs and Trade

Series 2 
 Anthony LaPaglia as Jan Roth, fugitive hacker living in West Papua
 Sigrid Thornton as Lara Dixon, head of the government's cyber ops unit
 Robyn Malcolm as Marina Baxter, Minister for Foreign Affairs
 Geoff Morrell as David Banks, Ned and Jesse's estranged father
 Ben Oxenbould as Nolan Daniels, senior AFP agent
 Ella Scott Lynch as Meg Flynn, a photographer and activist for West Papuan independence

Recurring

Canberra, Australian Capital Territory 
 David Roberts as Peter Lawson, political journalist, National News Australia (series 1)
 May Lloyd as Isabelle Banks, mother of Ned and Jesse (series 1)
 Steen Raskopoulos as Edan, editorial staff member at Password (series 1)
 Zindzi Okenyo as Millie Hussey, journalist at Password (series 1)
 Sophie Gregg as Trina Daniels, data encryption technician at Physanto (series 1)
 Erik Thomson as Niko Gaelle, international black marketeer in arms and stolen IP (series 1)
 Victoria Haralabidou as Alila Parande, Hani's mother (series 1 and 2)
 Michael Denkha as Nasim Parande, Hani's father, bio-tech engineer (series 1 and 2)
 Nathan Lovejoy as Will Sharp, Marina Baxter's Chief of Staff (series 2)
 Steve Rodgers as Malcolm Coover, head of AFP Cyber Crime Unit (series 1)
 Lindsay Farris as Dean Carson, AFP Cyber Crime Unit interrogator (series 1)
 Kelvin Shone as local policeman at Parliament House (series 1)
 Guy Edmonds as Gary Hunter/Youngblood, operator of the paedophile forum on the UndaCounta site (series 2)
 Otis Pavlovic as Callum McCray, abducted teenage boy (series 2)
 Sandy Winton as Michael McCray, Callum's father (series 2)
 Liz Harper as Courtney McCray, Callum's mother (series 2)
 Stephanie King as Erin Jennings, Ned's ex-girlfriend and contact at Parliament House (series 2)
 Arka Das as Farid (series 1)

Lindara, New South Wales 
 Aaron L. McGrath as Clarence Boyd, driver of the stolen car
 Aaron Pedersen as Tim Simons, local policeman at Lindara
 Ursula Yovich as Kitty Boyd, Clarence's mother
 Mitzi Ruhlmann as Missy Wisham, Alex's daughter
 Madeleine Madden as Sheyna Smith, the passenger in the car
 Tim McCunn as Carl Smith, Sheyna's father
 Lisa Flanagan as Eadie Smith, Sheyna's mother

West Papua 
 William Ani as Marcus Komblan, leader of the West Papuan independence movement
 Emele Ugavule as Kiki Gangi-Roth, Jan Roth's wife
 Annabelle Malaika Süess as Tahila Gangi-Roth, Jan Roth's daughter

Episodes

Series 1 (2014)

Series 2 (2016)

Production and filming
The fictional town of Lindara was filmed in Broken Hill, Silverton in New South Wales, and Cockburn in South Australia. The main street and post office of Cockburn doubles as the main street and school in Lindara, while the houses of the Lindara families were filmed in Silverton.

Parts of Canberra were used for filming, including the Australian Parliament House, the surrounds of Lake Burley Griffin, and parts of the Australian National University Acton campus, including the John Curtin School of Medical Research and the Shine Dome.

Broadcast
The first series was acquired by BBC Four in the United Kingdom in April 2014, and premiered on 11 October 2014, less than three weeks after the Australian premiere. Because it aired as back-to-back episodes over three weeks, the final episode aired first in the UK on 25 October, over twelve hours ahead of its first Australian broadcast 26 October. The first series was also broadcast on DirecTV's Audience Network in the US, and ARTV in Canada.

Awards and nominations

References

External links
 The Code: ABC TV
 

2014 Australian television series debuts
APRA Award winners
Australian Broadcasting Corporation original programming
English-language television shows
Television shows set in Australian Capital Territory
Television shows set in Indonesia
Television series by Playmaker Media
Political thriller television series
Australian political drama television series